Ma-Nee Chacaby (born July 22, 1950 ) is an Ojibwe-Cree writer and activist from Canada. She is most noted for her memoir, A Two-Spirit Journey: The Autobiography of a Lesbian Ojibwa-Cree Elder, which was co-authored by Mary Louisa Plummer and published by the University of Manitoba Press in 2016. The biography was awarded the U.S. Oral History Association's 2017 Book Award, as well as the Ontario Historical Society's 2018 Alison Prentice Award for Best Book on Women's History in Ontario. In addition, A Two-Spirit Journey was a shortlisted Lambda Literary Award finalist for Lesbian Memoir/Biography at the 29th Lambda Literary Awards in 2017, and was shortlisted for the Mary Scorer Award for Best Book by a Manitoba Publisher at the 2017 Manitoba Book Awards.

Born and raised in the remote Northern Ontario indigenous community of Ombabika, Chacaby escaped the Indian residential school system only because she was away hunting and trapping with her stepfather when government agents arrived in the community during the Sixties Scoop. She later lived in Winnipeg, Manitoba and Thunder Bay, Ontario, and sparked a local controversy when she openly identified herself as a lesbian in a television news story for Thunder Bay Television in 1988. She remained a local activist on LGBTQ and indigenous issues, and later began to create and exhibit work as a painter, before writing and publishing A Two-Spirit Journey.

In 2019, A Two-Spirit Journey was published in French as Un Parcours Bispirituel by Les éditions du remue-ménage. That same year, Chacaby served as one of the grand marshals of the Fierté Montréal parade.

References

21st-century Canadian non-fiction writers
21st-century First Nations writers
21st-century Canadian women writers
21st-century Canadian women artists
Artists from Ontario
Canadian women painters
Canadian memoirists
First Nations women writers
First Nations painters
Canadian LGBT rights activists
Canadian LGBT painters
Lesbian memoirists
Lesbian painters
LGBT First Nations people
Living people
Ojibwe people
Cree people
Writers from Thunder Bay
Two-spirit people
21st-century memoirists
Canadian lesbian writers
Canadian lesbian artists
Canadian women memoirists
1950 births
First Nations women artists
21st-century Canadian LGBT people